The large-headed flatbill (Ramphotrigon megacephalum), also known as the bamboo flatbill, is a species of bird in the family Tyrannidae.
It is found in Argentina, Bolivia, Brazil, Colombia, Ecuador, Paraguay, Peru, and Venezuela.
Its natural habitats are subtropical or tropical moist lowland forests and subtropical or tropical moist montane forests.

References

large-headed flatbill
Birds of South America
large-headed flatbill
Taxonomy articles created by Polbot